Rosenholm Station is a railway station on the Østfold Line located in the Holmlia neighborhood in the Søndre Nordstrand borough of Oslo, Norway. Situated  from Oslo Central Station (Oslo S), it features two side platforms. Rosenholm is served by the L2 line of the Oslo Commuter Rail. It features a major park and ride parking lot, but does not have a significant population near by.

History
The railway past Rosenholm opened on 5 June 1873. It was doubled 15 December 1936 and electrified on 18 January 1937. Holmlia was established as a suburb in the 1970s, although it had been served by a station since 1932. The Rosenholm area, albeit on the Oppegård side, was selected as the site of the Norwegian head offices for IBM, who opened their complex in 1987. The station is named for a smallholding which was previously situated northwest of the station.

Rosenholm Station was established with two goals in mind. The first was creating an efficient park and ride station for commuters from Follo and Østfold. The second was to target IBM employees. The station was situated too far from the residential area to be of much value for the residents at Holmlia. Proposals for a station at Rosenholm were first put forward in 1976, but at the time the Norwegian State Railways concluded that there would not be sufficient ridership from the station. By 1987 the number of residents and work places had increased sufficiently that the agency reconsidered. The station opened on 1 July 1988, after a large parking facility with 250 spaces built at the site. The site was chosen because it was immediately within the city limits of Oslo, and thus only have to pay an Oslo fare. It was also situated before Mosseveien on E18 where the greatest congestion occurs. The plans called for up to 800 parking places to be built in the future. Investments totaled 2.6 million Norwegian kroner.

Rosenholm never met its main targets, never becoming particularly popular with commuters nor with IBM employees. In later years the popularity has risen and by 2016 the Norwegian National Rail Administration was working with plans to expand the parking space.

Facilities
The Østfold Line past Grorud is double track and electrified.
 There is an overpass between the tracks to the south of the platforms. There are ticket machines and a bicycle shed at the station, as well as free parking for 212 cars.

Service
The station is served by line L2 of the Oslo Commuter Rail, operated by Vy. During regular hours this involves two trains per hour per direction which run from Ski Station via the Østfold Line to Oslo Central Station and onward to Skøyen Station. Rosenholm is not served by the express services. Travel time is 14 minutes to Oslo S and 20 to Ski.

References

Bibliography

 
 

Railway stations in Oslo
Railway stations on the Østfold Line
Railway stations opened in 1988
1988 establishments in Norway